Travel log or Travel Log may refer to:

Travel literature, records of a traveler's experiences
Travel-Log, album by JJ Cale
Travel Log, a vehicle built by Charles Kellogg